Student BMJ is a monthly, international medical journal for medical students and junior doctors. It is published by the BMJ Group.

Student BMJ was launched as a print journal in 1992 with the aim of publishing articles for medical students, and is compiled by a full-time student editor, who takes a year out from medical school. International expert authors and students work together to explain how to read research papers, provide practical careers advice, and put theory into practice both in print and online.

The current student editor is Charlotte Rose who works together with the current senior editor of BMJ.

History
Student BMJ was launched in print format in 1992, becoming the first international journal written specifically for medical students.

Articles 
Most of the articles are written by medical students and are submitted rather than commissioned. Student BMJ comprises News, Editorials, Life (a range of articles including debates, ethics, art, history, politics, and student experiences), Careers, Education, Picture quizzes, Research explained (a student friendly appraisal of a BMJ research paper), Views and reviews, and Eyespy (short, quirky medical stories).

Peer review 
Although it is a student journal, it functions as any other medical journal. Articles are peer reviewed by students from all over the world. The journal receives about 50 submissions each month. A decision is made to accept a manuscript or not within eight weeks on average. Only a handful of the submissions are finally accepted.

Impact and awards 
The journal has won the Guardian Student Media Award twice.

Other services 
The editorial team writes a monthly email alert called 5 Minutes for Students, with short summaries of articles and other services from the BMJ Group. The site also has a native iPhone app, which currently has five different categories in the main interface and allows bookmarking of articles.

Former student editors 
The following persons have been student editor of the journal:

References

External links

Monthly journals
English-language journals
Publications established in 1992
General medical journals
Academic journals edited by students
BMJ Group academic journals